Kerosene bush is a common name for several plants and may refer to:

Banksia nobilis, a plant species from Western Australia
Ozothamnus cupressoides, a plant species from eastern Australia
Ozothamnus hookeri, a plant species from eastern Australia

Banksia taxa by common name